Othman I was the emperor of the Kanem–Bornu Empire from 1356–1369 during the Sayfawa dynasty.

Rulers of the Kanem Empire
Year of birth missing
Year of death missing
14th-century monarchs in Africa